The Life I Remember is the debut studio album by American heavy metal band Once Human. It was released on September 4, 2015, through earMUSIC.

Background 
In 2014, after taking more than ten years off from performing live music, music producer and former Soulfly/Machine Head guitarist Logan Mader founded the band now known as Once Human.

On May 26, 2015, the ensemble published a lyric video of "The Life I Remember", the title track for the album.  An equivalent video of "Terminal" was unleashed on July 10, 2015.  Four weeks later, the group released "You Cunt", the first video from the ensemble portraying them playing alongside a theatrical plot.

Touring 
The band toured Europe in November and December 2015 with American industrial metal band Fear Factory.

Critical reception 
ArtistDirect indicated that title track "The Life I Remember" is "full of the crunch and grit that metal fans have come to love and expect from [Mader], who pounded out riffs in some essential, '90s-era metal bands".

Blabbermouth.net portrays Hart's singing as a "throat-scarring level of vocal brutality that completely contradicts her soft appearance".

According to Jeremy Borjon of Revolver magazine the band demonstrates "an impeccably produced, ruthless and mature sound in the vein of Arch Enemy and DevilDriver" with Hart bringing "the metal with clear and compelling screaming fleshed out by a groovy and thunderous rhythm section".

Track listing

Personnel 

Musicians
 Lauren Hart – vocals, rhythm guitar, piano, composition
 Logan Mader – lead guitar, composition, engineering, production
 Damien Rainaud – bass, composition, engineering
 Ralph Alexander – drums

Additional personnel

 Seth Siro Anton – artwork
 Maor Appelbaum – remastering
 Josh Franks – assistant engineering
 Tina Guo – cello

 Bill Hudson – additional guitars
 Nathan Mader – photography
 Gerard Marino – sound design
 Alexander Mertsch – layout

Videos 
 "The Life I Remember" (2015)
 "Terminal" (2015)
 "You Cunt" (2015)

References

External links 

2015 debut albums
Once Human albums
Edel AG albums